Hong Kong International Printing and Packaging Fair is an international trade show organised by the Hong Kong Trade Development Council and CIEC Exhibition Company (HK) Limited, held annually (usually in April) at the AsiaWorld-Expo, Hong Kong. The fair brings together under one roof top suppliers from the Chinese mainland, Hong Kong, Taiwan and Asia Pacific region. Their products and services include book printing, business printing, digital printing, gift packaging, food packaging, cosmetics packaging and medicine packaging. Suppliers and manufacturers offer products and services for trade buyers from around the world.

In 2009, the fair attracted 11,324 buyers from 108 countries and regions, 60% of whom were from overseas. The fair coincides with a peak sourcing season in Hong Kong and Guangdong, bringing thousands more buyers to the region. The world’s largest gifts fair, HKTDC Hong Kong Gifts & Premium Fair, and a large-scale well-established trade fair in Guangzhou will take place at the same time.

References

External links 

[Press release]http://hkprintpackfair.hktdc.com/press_rel/press_main.htm

Trade fairs in Hong Kong